Pilikula Nisargadhama (or Nisarga Dhama) is a multi-purpose tourist attraction, at Vamanjoor, eastern part of Mangalore city in Karnataka, managed by the District Administration of Dakshina Kannada. It is a major tourist attraction of Mangalore. It attracts large number of tourists due to the availability of multiple facilities.

Etymology 
In the Tulu language, "pili" means tiger and "kula" means lake. The name Tiger Lake is because tigers used to come to this lake to drink.

The state of Karnataka also has a nature preserve called Kaveri Nisargadhama, near Kushalnagar.

Facilities 
The Pilikula Nisarga Dhama Society has developed this area to offer scenic beauty and peace. Pilikula has a huge lake encircled by gardens. Swans and ducks swim in the lake and sometimes occupy the gardens. Boating facilities are available in the lake. Couples prefer pedal boats; larger parties use motor boats that carry 10 to 15 people.

Botanical Garden and Arboretum 

The Pilikula Arboretum (Pilikula Botanical Garden) extends over 35 ha. About 60,000 seedlings belonging to 236 taxa of flowering plants of Western Ghats, spread over 60 families, have been planted randomly as well as family clusters. They include 70 taxa endemic to the Western Ghats region, whose conservation is the arboretum's focus. The arboretum contains not only threatened species but also a few species that had been considered extinct.

The arboretum also includes 6 acres devoted to medicinal plants with more than 460 varieties, often visited by students of botany and Ayurvedic medicine.

Nine aquatic ponds contain plants such as lotus and lilies.

Zoo and water park 

On the other side of the road, there is a zoo featuring several wild animals. The animals are not kept in cages but are in the open, with more natural barriers, such as wide trenches or wire mesh, to separate them from visitors. There are tigers, leopards, bears and other wild animals inside the park. There is also a variety of snakes and birds in the zoo.

Adjacent to the zoo is the Manasa Water Park, which is similar to the Water Kingdom in Mumbai.

Science centre 
Pilikula Regional Science Centre was inaugurated in October 2014, with an area of approximately 4000 square metres.

3D Planetarium 

Swami Vivekananda Planetarium situated in Pilikula is the 1st and the only 3D Planetarium in India.

Golf course 

The Pilikula Golf Course is an 18-hole golf course set in an area of  comprising nine fairways and nine greens, with a total of about  through hilly terrain. Mid-day weather can be problematic but serious golfers play through it. Popular times of tee-off are usually early in the morning (6:30), and in the evenings after 4:00.

The annual Pilikula Challenge Cup attracts more than 150 golfers from Coorg, Mysore, Chikmagalur, and Bangalore.

The club has over 500 members. A clubhouse inaugurated in December 2010 has 7 rooms, a restaurant, and a bar.

Heritage village 

Tulunadu culture is displayed here. Ancient house exhibiting various ancient Tulunad traditions, culture, dance forms, pottery, handicrafts, cuisine etc.

Transport 
Pilikula is just south of the Gurupura River, off National Highway 169. It can be reached using city buses. However, a personal vehicle would make it easier to visit all the facilities. Inside Pilikula battery operated car facilities are available. 

Distance from other nearby major tourist destinations: 
Pumpwell, Mangalore - 12 km
New Mangalore Port, Mangalore- 13 km
Tannirbhavi Beach, Mangalore- 16 km
Panambur Beach,  Mangalore - 17 km
National Institute of Technology Karnataka, Surathkal, Mangalore - 22 km
Infosys DC, Mudipu, Mangalore - 28 km
Sasihithlu Beach, Mangalore  - 30 km
Manipal - 71 km
Dharmasthala - 73 km
Kukke Subramanya Temple - 104 km
Kannur, Kerala - 147 km
Murdeshwar - 165 km
Gokarna, Karnataka - 240 km
Mysore - 253 km
Bangalore - 349 km
Hubli - 354 km
Panaji, Goa- 374 km

Nearest Railway Stations:
Mangalore Junction railway station, Kankanady, Mangalore - 11 km
Mangalore Central railway station, Hampankatta, Mangalore - 13 km
Surathkal railway station, Surathkal, Mangalore - 20 km

Nearest Airport:
 Mangalore International Airport (India) - 12 km

Climate 
Mangalore has a tropical monsoon climate and is under the direct influence of the Arabian Sea branch of the southwest monsoon.

See also 
 Mahatma Gandhi Road (Mangalore)
 K S Rao Road
 NITK Beach
 Panambur Beach
 Tannirbhavi Beach
 Ullal beach
 Someshwar Beach
 Sasihithlu Beach
 Kadri Park
 Tagore Park
 St. Aloysius Chapel
 Bejai Museum
 Aloyseum
 Kudla Kudru

References 

Tourist attractions in Mangalore
Parks in Mangalore
Botanical gardens in India
Biosphere reserves of India
Zoos in India